Mulgrave is a suburb north west of Sydney, in the state of New South Wales, Australia. It is a predominantly industrial and commercial area.

History 
The district was settled in the period between 1794 and 1800.  Lieutenant-Governor Grose named the locality 'Mulgrave Place' honouring Constantine Phipps, the second Baron Mulgrave, who had died in 1792.  Baron Mulgrave had been an English naval officer and statesman and a colleague and friend of Joseph Banks.

Transport
Mulgrave railway station is on the T1 North Shore & Western line and the T5 Cumberland line. It is four stations from the terminus station at Richmond. The station along with the arrival of a steam train features in The Seekers at Home TV special, 1968. Filmed as the setting for the song "Angeline is always Friday", steam hauled services ceased to operate shortly afterwards.

Demographics 
Mulgrave's population is 92 (Census 2016). It had a median weekly household income of A$2,062, which is 143.4% above the national average.

References

Suburbs of Sydney
City of Hawkesbury